Ariyalur, is a developing residential area in  Manali New Town, North Chennai, a metropolitan city in Tamil Nadu, India

Location

Theeyampakkam is located near Manali in North Chennai with Vichoor in the north, Kosappur in the west, Andarkuppam in the east and Mathur to the South. Other neighbouring areas include Madhavaram, Kodungaiyur.

The arterial roads to Ariyalur are the Anna Salai (Andarkuppam-Redhills Road), Vaikkadu-Ammulaivoyal Road, Madhavaram Milk Colony Road and the Kamarajar Salai. This part of Chennai was considered to be rural even its location within Greater Chennai Corporation limits. With the Inner Ring Road becoming functional the area was easily accessible from the Chennai Mofussil Bus Terminus, now renamed as Puratchi Thalaivi Dr. M.G.R. Bus Terminus.

References

External links
Corporation of Chennai
CMDA Official Webpage

Neighbourhoods in Chennai